is a Japanese football player for Veertien Mie.

Playing career
Hayato Michiue joined to Matsumoto Yamaga FC in 2014. In July 2015, he moved to Azul Claro Numazu.

Club statistics
Updated to 20 February 2018.

References

External links
Profile at Veertien Mie 

1991 births
Living people
Momoyama Gakuin University alumni
Association football people from Osaka Prefecture
Japanese footballers
J1 League players
J2 League players
Japan Football League players
Matsumoto Yamaga FC players
Azul Claro Numazu players
Veertien Mie players
Association football midfielders